Kazi Habibul Awal (born 21 January 1956) is a retired Senior Secretary and the incumbent Chief Election Commissioner of Bangladesh.

Early life and education 
Awal was born on 21 January 1956 in Comilla District, East Pakistan, Pakistan to a family from Sandwip Island. His father was the Deputy Inspector General of Prison Kazi Abdul Awal who was the plaintiff in the Jail Killing case. He obtained his Bachelor of Laws and Master of Laws from Dhaka University in 1976 and 1978 respectively. His mother was Begum Nafisa Khatun.

Career 
He started his career as an assistant judge (Munsif) in 1981 after passing the Bangladesh Civil Service exam. He was promoted to District and Sessions Judge in 1996.

He was the Joint Secretary of the Ministry of Law and Parliamentary Affairs in 2000, Additional Secretary in 2003 and Secretary of the same Ministry on 28 June 2007. On 5 July 2007, Judge Aftab Uddin Ahmed filed a petition against the appointment of Awal as acting secretary.

He was the Secretary of the Ministry of Religious affairs ministry in 2010 and in 2013 was transferred to the Office of the President. Later he became the Secretary of the Ministry of Defense in 2014. Promoted to Senior Secretary in the Ministry of Defense in December 2014. He retired in 2015 and got two contractual appointments till 2017.

Controversies 
Following the appointment of Kazi Habibul Awal as Additional Secretary of the Legal and Drafting Branch of the Law Ministry, Justice Shah Abu Nayeem Mominur Rahman and Justice Shahidul Islam declared his appointment illegal in 2010. He also apologized for the incident when a parliamentary committee summoned him for illegally retiring two judges while he was the Additional Secretary of the Legal and Drafting Branch of the Law Ministry. Judicial officials, including a court judge, staged a protest demanding his removal, alleging that he was involved in various controversial activities, including denying the interests of judges and preventing the government from paying separate Salary-Allowance to judges.

Personal life 
Kazi Habibul Awal is married in private life. His wife is Sahana Akhter Khanam. The couple has three daughters.

References 

1956 births
Living people
University of Dhaka alumni
Dhaka College alumni
Chief Election Commissioners of Bangladesh
People from Chittagong District
Bangladeshi civil servants